Haimbili Haufiku Senior Secondary School is a school at east of Eenhana town in the Ohangwena Region of Namibia. It was established in 1988. R.M.O Shaninga  is the current principal of the school.

Haimbili Haufiku Senior Secondary School is one of the best schools countrywide. Its learners frequently get awards for high performance, and in 2009 learners won a national High School competition sponsored by the Bank of Namibia. The school occupied rank 13 in the national A-level results in 2012, and rank 16 in 2013.

See also
 List of schools in Namibia
 Education in Namibia

References

Schools in Ohangwena Region
Educational institutions established in 1988
1988 establishments in South West Africa